Little Rock National Cemetery is a United States National Cemetery, located approximately two miles (3 km) south-east of the Arkansas State Capitol Building, being within the city of Little Rock, and Pulaski County, Arkansas. It encompasses , and as of the end of 2005, had 25,172 interments. Administered by the United States Department of Veterans Affairs, it is currently closed to new interments.

History 
The area around Little Rock National Cemetery was once a Union encampment. The cemetery itself was a plot within the Little Rock City Cemetery, purchased by the federal government in 1866 and was used to inter Union soldiers who died anywhere in Arkansas. It was officially declared a National Cemetery on April 9, 1868 at which time  were added.

In 1884, an  Confederate cemetery was established immediately adjacent to the National Cemetery. In 1938, the two cemeteries were combined, though the Union and Confederate burials continued to be in separate sections.

In 1990, additional land was purchased from the nearby Oakland-Fraternal Cemetery, and in November 1999 the city of Little Rock donated , bringing the cemetery to its current size.

Little Rock National Cemetery was listed on the National Register of Historic Places in 1996.

Noteworthy monuments 
 The Confederate Memorial, erected in 1884.
 The Minnesota Monument, a granite and bronze monument erected in 1916.

Notable interments 
 Lieutenant Maurice Britt (1919–1995), Medal of Honor recipient for action in World War II, Lieutenant Governor of Arkansas

 Sergeant Simon A. Haley (1892–1973), professor of agriculture and father of author Alex Haley
 Dick Hogan (1917–1995), actor
 Earl Sutton Smith (1897–1963), Major League Baseball player
 Captain John H. Yancey (1918–1986), decorated United States Marine of World War II and the Korean War

See also

 National Register of Historic Places listings in Little Rock, Arkansas
 List of cemeteries in Arkansas

References

External links 

 National Cemetery Administration
 Little Rock National Cemetery
 Little Rock National Cemetery List of Burials
 
 
 

Cemeteries in Little Rock, Arkansas
Cemeteries on the National Register of Historic Places in Arkansas
Historic American Landscapes Survey in Arkansas
National Register of Historic Places in Little Rock, Arkansas
Protected areas of Pulaski County, Arkansas
Tourist attractions in Little Rock, Arkansas
United States national cemeteries
1868 establishments in Arkansas
Cemeteries established in the 1860s